Indusatumab vedotin (MLN-0264) is an antibody-drug conjugate that is under development for the treatment of pancreatic cancer and other gastrointestinal cancers. It consists of a monoclonal antibody (indusatumab) that targets the enzyme guanylate cyclase 2C which is present in some cancers, linked to an average of three to four molecules of the chemotherapeutic agent monomethyl auristatin E (MMAE).

It was in Phase II clinical trials . The trials were terminated in 2017 because of insufficient efficacy.

References

Experimental drugs